Luigi Palmieri (22 April 1807 – 9 September 1896) was an Italian physicist and meteorologist. He was famous for his scientific studies of the eruptions of Mount Vesuvius, for his  researches on earthquakes and meteorological phenomena and for improving the seismograph of the time.

Biography 
Palmieri was born in Faicchio, Benevento, Italy and died in Naples, Italy at the age of 89.

Palmieri received a degree in physics from the University of Naples. In 1845, he was made Professor of Physics at the Royal Naval School in Naples and in 1847 was appointed as Chair of Physics at the university. In 1848, he began working at the Vesuvius Observatory and in 1854  was appointed as Director of the Observatory. Using an electromagnetic seismometer for the detection and measurement of ground tremors,  Palmieri was able to detect very slight movements in trying to predict volcanic  eruptions. Furthermore, he was the first to detect the presence of Helium on Earth on the lava of Mount Vesuvius.

Using a modified Peltier electrometer, he also carried out research in the field of atmospheric electricity. Other scientific contributions included the development of a modified Morse telegraph, and improvements to the anemometer and pluviometer.

Biography
 Royal Society of Naples (Academy of Sciences) – 1861
 Academy of the Lincei (Florence) – 1871
American Philosophical Society (Philadelphia) -- 1873

See also
 Helium

Honours 
 The crater Palmieri on the Moon
 Member of the Superior Council of Meteorology
 Senator of the London tower
 Grand Commander of the Order of the Crown of Italy
 Commander of the Order of Rosa del Brazile

Publications 

 "Annali dell' osservatorio Vesuviano". 1859–1873.
 "Incendio Vesuviano del 26 Aprile 1872". Naples, 1872. (Ger.: Berlin, 1872)
 "Il Vesuvio e la sua storia". Milan, 1880.
 "Nuove lezioni di fisica sperimentale e di fisica terrestre". Naples, 1883.
 "Die Atmospharische Elektrizität". Vienna, 1884.
 "Les lois et les origines de l'électricité". Paris, 1885.

References

External links 
 "Luigi Palmieri". Catholic Encyclopedia, Volume XI. Robert Appleton Company, 1911. (K. Knight, 2003)
 
 

19th-century Italian physicists
Italian meteorologists
People from the Province of Benevento
1807 births
1896 deaths